Monomyces is a genus of corals belonging to the family Flabellidae.

The genus has almost cosmopolitan distribution, except Arctic and Subarctic regions.

Species:

Monomyces eburneus 
Monomyces pusillus 
Monomyces pygmaea 
Monomyces rubrum

References

Flabellidae
Scleractinia genera
Taxa named by Christian Gottfried Ehrenberg